Malibu Shark Attack (a.k.a. Mega Shark of Malibu) is a 2009 TV film, directed by David Lister and produced for the Syfy channel. It is the 19th film in the Maneater Series.

Plot
Heather (Peta Wilson) is the head-lifeguard on a Malibu beach, alongside her ex-boyfriend Chavez (Warren Christie), Doug (Remi Broadway) and Barb (Sonya Salomaa). Also on the beach are Jenny (Chelan Simmons), a teenage girl who is reluctantly cleaning the beach for community service after she got caught shoplifting, and Bryan (Nicholas G. Cooper), Barb's boyfriend who proposes to her. Meanwhile, a tremor unleashes a group of Living fossil goblin sharks who begin to devour swimmers along the beach. Chavez travels to a nearby house that is undergoing construction and meets with the workers Colin (Jeffery Gannon), who is Heather's new boyfriend, George (Mungo McKay), Yancey (Renee Bowen) and Karl (Evert McQueen). A warning of a tsunami arises and Chavez returns to the beach, saving Heather who had been knocked into the water by a shark after being sent to investigate some people causing trouble in the water. Doug and Barb evacuate the beach, and take shelter in the lifeguard hut with Heather, Chavez, Jenny and Bryan.

As the tsunami hits, Bryan is knocked unconscious and Jenny suffers a large cut on her leg. Heather manages to stitch the cut together; however, the blood attracts the goblin sharks, and the group realize they are stranded in the hut, with help unlikely due to the damage the tsunami has created. The sharks soon begin to attack the hut and manage to break the floor, dragging Barb out and devouring her. As the group mourn Barb's death, the construction crew have become stranded in the house where they were working. Yancey decides to try to swim to land and get help; however, she is quickly attacked and eaten by sharks. Then a shark jumps up and drags Karl into the water. Soon after, Colin and George discover a boat and begin to travel to the hut. Back at the hut, the group manage to kill one of the sharks, and Chavez swims out of the hut to retrieve a flare gun. The others attempt to distract the sharks, but one attempts to eat Chavez, resulting in him shooting and killing the shark with the flare gun, instead of summoning help.

Chavez returns, and the group move up to the roof as the sharks continue to damage the hut. Colin and George arrive on the boat and everyone boards, but the fuel soon runs out, forcing them to drift to land. After hours, the boat reaches the house that was under construction. The boat becomes stuck on a gate, so George enters the site to try to find pliers to open the gate. As the rest wait, the sharks arrive. Bryan jumps into the water, sacrificing himself so the rest can escape. Doug, Jenny and Colin manage to get into the flooded house and encounter a shark but manage to kill it, while Heather and Chavez discover a half eaten George, before taking shelter in a car, where they reconcile. Chavez kills another shark, before entering the house with Heather. The group meet up, and manage to trap and kill the final shark. In the morning, a helicopter arrives to rescue the survivors

Cast
 Peta Wilson as Heather
 Warren Christie as Chavez
 Remi Broadway as Doug Crenshaw
 Chelan Simmons as Jenny
 Sonya Salomaa as Barbara "Barb" Simmons
 Nicolas G. Cooper as Bryan Conroy
 Jeff Gannon as Colin Smith
 Mungo McKay as George
 Evert McQueen as Karl
 Renee Bowen as Yancey

Reviews
Reviews have been mostly negative.

Home media
Malibu Shark Attack was released on DVD on August 16, 2011.

External links

 
 
 

2009 horror films
Syfy original films
Maneater (film series)
Films about sharks
2009 television films
Films about shark attacks
2009 films
Australian action adventure films
Australian comedy horror films
Films directed by David Lister
2000s American films